Alexander Allen Silvestro (born November 15, 1988) is a former American football tight end/defensive end who played in the National Football League (NFL). He played college football at Rutgers.

Prior to Rutgers, Silvestro played for Paulsboro High School in Paulsboro, New Jersey.

Professional career

New England Patriots
As a defensive end, he was signed by the New England Patriots as an undrafted free agent in 2011. On February 4, 2012, he was called up to replace a former college teammate, Tiquan Underwood, on the active roster of the New England Patriots, one day before Super Bowl XLVI, though he didn't appear in the game. During the 2012 OTAs and minicamp, Silvestro was forced into duty at tight end due to a shortage at that position of the roster.

Baltimore Ravens
In November 2012, he was signed by the Baltimore Ravens to the practice squad. On August 30, 2013, he was released by the Ravens.

References

External links
New England Patriots bio

1988 births
Living people
American football defensive ends
Baltimore Ravens players
New England Patriots players
Paulsboro High School alumni
People from Greenwich Township, Gloucester County, New Jersey
People from Paulsboro, New Jersey
Players of American football from New Jersey
Rutgers Scarlet Knights football players
Sportspeople from Gloucester County, New Jersey